The 3rd Cavalry Division was a division of the British Army in the First World War. It was formed at Ludgershall, Wiltshire England in September 1914 under the command of Major-General the Hon. Julian Byng. The division moved to Belgium in the first week of October 1914, landing at Ostend, although its third Brigade was only formed there once.
During the war the division took part in most of the major actions where cavalry were used as a mounted mobile force, and also many where the troops were dismounted and effectively served as infantry.

On 11 November 1918, units of the division had reached the River Dender at Leuze and Lessines in Belgium, when orders were received that they would cover the advance of the British Second Army into Germany. They started the advance on 17 November, divisional headquarters being established at Waterloo on 21 November. The following year they wintered in Belgium, and the division was officially demobilised by 31 March 1919.

History

Formation
The 3rd Cavalry Division began forming on 1 September 1914 at Ludgershall, Wiltshire.  Initially it commanded just two cavalry brigades – the 6th and the 7th – and divisional troops.

The 6th Cavalry Brigade was formed with the 1st Dragoons and the 10th Hussars, both from Potchefstroom, South Africa, and the 3rd Dragoon Guards from the Force in Egypt (though they did not join the brigade until 4 November in Belgium), the only regular British Army cavalry regiments not stationed in the United Kingdom or India at the outbreak of the war.

The 7th Cavalry Brigade was formed with the three Household Cavalry regiments, the only regular cavalry regiments remaining in the United Kingdom after mobilization of the BEF and its transport to France.  The 1st Life Guards joined from Hyde Park, the 2nd Life Guards from Regent's Park and the Royal Horse Guards from Windsor.  Each regiment only consisted of two squadrons as each had provided a squadron to the Household Cavalry Composite Regiment in 4th Cavalry Brigade in August 1914.  The detached squadrons did not rejoin their parent regiments until 11 November 1914 in Belgium.

XV Brigade, Royal Horse Artillery (and Brigade Ammunition Column) was formed for the division.  In peacetime, K Battery, RHA was at Christchurch and C Battery, RHA at Canterbury.  Later, G Battery, RHA (originally at Ipswich) would join in Belgium.  Strangely, two RHA brigades formed early in the war were simultaneously designated as XV Brigade, RHA.  The other was formed at Leamington, Warwickshire in January 1915 for 29th Division. The 3rd Cavalry Division's brigade was renumbered as IV Brigade, RHA in May 1915.

The 3rd Field Squadron, Royal Engineers was formed on 16 September and the 3rd Signal Squadron, Royal Engineers on 12 September, both at Ludgershall. The division was also provided with two Cavalry Field Ambulances (6th and 7th), two Mobile Veterinary Sections (13th and 14th), and a divisional supply column (four companies of the Army Service Corps).

The division departed Ludgershall on 5 October, embarked at Southampton on 6 October and landed at Ostend on 8 October (7th Brigade at Zeebrugge on 7 October) and deployed to the Western Front in France and Belgium.

Early actions

The 3rd Cavalry Division served on the Western Front until the end of the war.  In 1914, the division saw action in the defence of Antwerp (9 and 10 October) and the First Battle of Ypres, notably the battles of Langemarck (21–24 October), Gheluvelt (29–31 October) and Nonne Bosschen (11 November).

To bring the division up to the standard strength of three brigades, the 8th Cavalry Brigade was formed in Belgium on 20 November 1914 with the 10th Hussars from 6th Cavalry Brigade and the Royal Horse Guards from 7th Cavalry Brigade. Each brigade was made up to three-regiment strength with yeomanry regiments: 6th Cavalry Brigade with the 1/1st North Somerset Yeomanry from 1st South Western Mounted Brigade, 7th Cavalry Brigade with the 1/1st Leicestershire Yeomanry from North Midland Mounted Brigade, and 8th Cavalry Brigade with the 1/1st Essex Yeomanry from Eastern Mounted Brigade. With the addition of its third brigade, 3rd Cavalry Division also obtained a third Cavalry Field Ambulance (8th, from England on 23 December) and a third Mobile Veterinary Section (20th, from England on 9 March 1915).

1915–17
In 1915, the division took part in the Second Battle of Ypres (Battle of Frezenberg Ridge, 11–13 May) and the Battle of Loos (26–28 September).

On 29 February 1916, Machine Gun Squadrons were added to the cavalry brigades, formed from the machine gun sections of each brigade's constituent regiments.

1916 saw no notable actions, but in 1917 the division saw action in the Battle of Arras (First Battle of the Scarpe, 9–12 April). At other times, the brigades formed dismounted units and served in the trenches as regiments under the command of their brigadiers.

Reconstituted
In March 1918, the 4th (formerly 1st Indian) and 5th (formerly 2nd Indian) Cavalry Divisions were broken up in France.  The Indian elements were sent to Egypt where they formed part of the new 4th and 5th Cavalry Divisions which played a major part in the successful conclusion of the Sinai and Palestine Campaign.  The British and Canadian units remained in France and most of them were transferred to the 3rd Cavalry Division causing it to be extensively reorganized.

The Household Cavalry regiments were concentrated in the 7th Cavalry Brigade and the yeomanry regiments in the 8th Cavalry Brigade.  The latter left the division on 14 March 1918, the day after the Canadian Cavalry Brigade joined from 5th Cavalry Division. The three Household Cavalry regiments left 7th Cavalry Brigade on 10 March.  They were dismounted and converted to machine gunners as No. 1 (1st Life Guards), No. 2 (2nd Life Guards) and No. 3 (Royal Horse Guards) Battalions of the Guards Machine Gun Regiment at Étaples. They were replaced in the brigade on the same day by the 7th Dragoon Guards from 9th (Secunderabad) Cavalry Brigade of the 5th Cavalry Division, the 6th (Inniskilling) Dragoons from 5th (Mhow) Cavalry Brigade of the 4th Cavalry Division and the 17th Lancers from 2nd (Sialkot) Cavalry Brigade also of the 4th Cavalry Division. On 11 March, all three regiments came on the British War Establishment i.e. changed from a 4-squadron to a 3-squadron organisation.

1918 saw the return of the war of movement and the division took part in the First Battle of the Somme notably the Battle of St Quentin (21–23 March), Actions of the Somme Crossings (24 and 25 March) and Battle of the Avre (4 and 5 April); the Battle of Amiens and the battles of the Hindenburg Line (Battle of Cambrai, 8 and 9 October and the Pursuit to the Selle, 9–12 October).  Its final action was in the Advance in Flanders (9–11 November).

Armistice
At the Armistice, units of the division had reached the River Dender at Leuze and Lessines in Belgium, when orders were received that they would cover the advance of the Second Army into Germany. They started the advance on 17 November, divisional headquarters being established at Waterloo on 21 November. Transport difficulties meant that the only one cavalry division could advance with Second Army so the following winter was spent in Belgium.  By 31 March 1919, the division was demobilized.

Order of battle

6th Cavalry Brigade

6th Cavalry Brigade was formed on 19 September 1914 at Ludgershall, Wiltshire and served with the division throughout the war.

7th Cavalry Brigade

7th Cavalry Brigade was formed on 1 September 1914 at Ludgershall, Wiltshire and served with the division throughout the war.  It was extensively restructured on 10 March 1918.

8th Cavalry Brigade

8th Cavalry Brigade was formed in Belgium on 20 November 1914.  It left the division on 14 March 1918, the day after the Canadian Cavalry Brigade joined.

Canadian Cavalry Brigade

The Canadian Cavalry Brigade was attached to the division from 10 April to 17 June 1916 before transferring to the 2nd Indian Cavalry Division. It rejoined the division on 13 March 1918 from 5th Cavalry Division.

Royal Canadian Dragoons
Lord Strathcona's Horse
Fort Garry Horse
Canadian Cavalry Brigade Machine-Gun Squadron
Canadian Cavalry Signal Troop

Divisional Artillery
IV Brigade, Royal Horse Artillery
C Battery, Royal Horse Artillery attached to 6th Cavalry Brigade
G Battery, Royal Horse Artillery attached to 8th Cavalry Brigade
K Battery, Royal Horse Artillery attached to 7th Cavalry Brigade
IV Brigade Ammunition Column
Royal Canadian Horse Artillery Brigade (rejoined the Canadian Cavalry Brigade on 14 April 1918)
A Battery, RCHA
B Battery, RCHA

Divisional Troops
The division was supported by the following units:

Commanders
The 3rd Cavalry Division had the following commanders:

See also

List of British divisions in World War I
British Army during World War I
British Cavalry Corps order of battle 1914
British cavalry during the First World War

Notes

References

Bibliography

External links
 

3
3
Military units and formations established in 1914
Military units and formations disestablished in 1919
1914 establishments in the United Kingdom